Jesu dulcis memoria is a Christian hymn often attributed to  Saint Bernard of Clairvaux.  The name can refer either to the entire poem, which, depending on the manuscript, ranges from forty-two to fifty-three stanzas, or only the first part.

Three sections of it are used as hymns in the Liturgy of the Hours of the Feast of the Holy Name of Jesus: "Iesu dulcis memoria" (Vespers), "Iesu rex admirabilis" (Matins), "Iesu decus angelicum" (Lauds).

Several English hymns sung today are based on translations of Jesu dulcis memoria. These include "Jesus, Thou Joy of Loving Hearts" (1858 translation by Ray Palmer) and "Jesus, the Very Thought of Thee" (1849 translation by Edward Caswall).

Opening stanzas
(See Thesaurus Precum Latinarum)

Music
The tune to which the hymn was sung can be heard at Oremus Hymnal. It has also been set to music by Giovanni Pierluigi da Palestrina, Tomás Luis de Victoria, and others.

Alan Gray's 1928 anthem What are these that glow from afar?, composed in memory of his two sons lost in the war, uses a quotation from Jesu dulcis memoria to great effect.

Tenth Avenue North covered the song on their album Cathedrals.

References

External links

 
 

Catholic liturgy
Latin-language Christian hymns